Novo is a 2002 film by Jean-Pierre Limosin.

Novo may also refer to:

Novo (surname)
"Novo" (song), by Laura Pausini, 2018
"Novo", a song by Millencolin from Kingwood
Novo, 1970s-1980s Soviet reissue of some Frog model kits
Novo Group comprising Novo Nordisk
Novo Industrial Corporation, owner of Delta Electric Company
New Party, a political party in Brazil
Novo Cinemas, a chain of movie theatres in the Middle East.

Places
Novo, Russia, several rural localities in Russia

See also

De novo (disambiguation), a Latin expression meaning "from the beginning"
Ex novo, a Latin expression meaning "from new"

Nova (disambiguation)
Nove (disambiguation)
Novi (disambiguation)
Novus (disambiguation)
Novy (disambiguation)